The 1968 Volta a Catalunya was the 48th edition of the Volta a Catalunya cycle race and was held from 8 September to 15 September 1968. The race started in Tona and finished in Barcelona. The race was won by Eddy Merckx.

General classification

References

1968
Volta
1968 in Spanish road cycling